Amphipyra fuscusa is a moth in the family Noctuidae first described by Wei-Chun Chang in 1989. It is found in Taiwan.

References

Moths described in 1989
Amphipyrinae
Moths of Taiwan